This is a list of episodes of the American animated television series New Looney Tunes. The show premiered on September 21, 2015 on Cartoon Network and October 5, 2015 on Boomerang.

Series overview

Episodes

Season 1: Wabbit./Bugs! (2015–18)

Season 2 (2018–19)
The first 13 episodes were released in the United States on June 25, 2018 (with the exception of episodes 5 and 13, which were released earlier). Season 2 premiered in the United Kingdom and Ireland on September 4, 2017.

Note: All release dates listed are for Boomerang's streaming service unless otherwise noted.

Season 3 (2019–20)

References

New Looney Tunes
Lists of Cartoon Network television series episodes